Orodes is the Latinized form of a male given name of Iranian origin popular among Parthians. People bearing the name include:

Kings of Parthia
Orodes I of Parthia c. 90–80 BC
Orodes II of Parthia c. 57–38 BC
Orodes III of Parthia c. 6

Kings of Elymais
Orodes I of Elymais (c. 25- c. 50 AD)
Orodes II of Elymais (c. 50- c. 70 AD)
Orodes III (c. 90- c. 100 AD)
Orodes IV of Elymais (c. 140- c. 160 AD)
Orodes V (c. 170- c. 180 AD)
Orodes VI (c. 220- 224 AD)

Other
Orodes of Armenia, king in 35 and from 37 until 42
Septimius Worod, a Palmyrene official
Worod, a king of the Kingdom of Hatra; see Hatra

Lists of people by given name